Arnulf I may refer to:

Arnulf I, Count of Flanders (r. 918–964)
Arnulf I (archbishop of Milan) (r. 970–974)